María Cristina del Pino Segura Gómez, known as Pinito del Oro  (6 November 1931 – 25 October 2017), was a Spanish trapeze artist and novelist. She was perhaps best known for her seven-year run with Ringling Circus.

Early life
María Cristina del Pino Segura Gómez was born on 6 November 1931 in the neighborhood of Guanarteme (Las Palmas de Gran Canaria). Her father, José Segura Fenollar, was one of the eleven brothers of the circus Hermanos Segura. She was the youngest of the seven children who lived of the 19 children her mother had. All the siblings became artists.

During her childhood, she recalled that one night in which the "troupe Segura" traveled from Cádiz to the Seville Fair, the truck overturned and her sister Esther was killed. Her father, although he did not believe in Cristina's talent, found it necessary to promote her to the trapeze to sustain the family business.

Career
During a Christmas in Valencia, when she was working in a small circus, Pinito was seen by a Ringling Bros. and Barnum & Bailey representative during a Europe trip, which led to the circus offering her a job. She accepted the offer and moved to the United States with her husband. She worked for seven years at the Ringling Circus, where she won many awards during the 1960s.

Cecil B. DeMille tried to hire Pinito for The Greatest Show on Earth, but she rejected it because DeMille did not want her to appear on the credits.

Pinito suffered three near-fatal falls in Huelva, Sweden and Laredo. In the first, when she was 17 years old, she fractured her skull and remained in a coma for eight days. She would soon fracture her skull again, her hands three times, and had to undergo foot surgery to raise her toes since they curved from the frequent contact with the trapeze, 12 to 16 meters above the ground.

After suffering multiple accidents, Pinito retired from the trapeze in 1961. A few years later, in 1968, she reappeared in the Circo Price of Madrid under the direction of Feijoo and Castilla. She retired from the trapeze permanently on April 17, 1976.

In addition to the circus performances, Pinito del Oro found time to publish some novels: Born for the Circus (Nacida para el circo), The Eve (La víspera) and The Italian (El italiano). With them, she was a finalist in some literary contests such as the "City of Oviedo" and "Blasco Ibáñez".

Pinito's name was often synonymous with skill in the aerial arts: You're going to fall, you are not Pinito del Oro! (¡Que te vas a caer, a ver si te crees Pinito del Oro!).

Honors
The house of the culture of Albaladejo in the province of Ciudad Real takes the name "Pinito del Oro" in honor of Pinito's mother, who was a citizen of this locality in Castile-La Mancha. She has an image in The Wax Museum of Madrid.

In 2017, after receiving the Gold Medal of Canaria, she reflected on her life: "I just felt happy on the trapeze. I have triumphed in the artistic world, I achieved everything, personally the balance is not so positive."

Death
Pinito del Oro died on 25 October 2017 at her home in Las Palmas de Gran Canaria at the age of 85.

Awards
National Prize of Circus (1990)
Gold Medal of Canarias (2017)

References

External links
 

1930 births
2017 deaths
Trapeze artists
Acrobats
Ringling Bros. and Barnum & Bailey Circus
Ringling Bros. and Barnum & Bailey Circus people
People from Las Palmas
Spanish circus performers